Glochidion taitense, also known by the synonym Phyllanthus taitensis or as mahame in Tahitian, is a species of tree or shrub in the family Phyllanthaceae. It is endemic to the Windward Society Islands of French Polynesia. It is common on the island of Tahiti, where it grows in a wide variety of habitats, but has only been collected once on the nearby island of Moorea, only 17 kilometers distant. It is easily distinguishable from other species of Glochidion on Tahiti and Moorea due to the pubescence on its leaves, young branches, and flowers.

References

Flora of French Polynesia
taitense
Least concern plants
Taxa named by Louis Antoine François Baillon
Taxonomy articles created by Polbot